Stand By Me (Whatcha See Is Whatcha Get) is an album led by jazz drummer Bernard Purdie which was recorded for the Mega label in 1971 and released on their Flying Dutchman Series.

Reception

Victor W. Valdivia of Allmusic writes, "Stand by Me is a frustrating album. Bernard "Pretty" Purdie was always an extraordinarily talented musician, but as a bandleader and songwriter, he was inconsistent at best... Stand by Me has some high points, but is not the place for newcomers to discover Purdie's talents".

Track listing
 "Stand by Me" (Ben E. King, Jerry Leiber, Mike Stoller) – 4:55  
 "Modern Jive" (Bernard Purdie, Richard Tee) – 3:18  
 "Spanish Harlem" (Mike Leiber, Phil Spector) – 3:29  
 "Artificialness" (Purdie, Gil Scott-Heron) – 3:05  
 "Never Can Say Goodbye" (Clifton Davis) – 3:00  
 "Whatcha See Is Whatcha Get" (Tony Hester) – 5:13  
 "It's Too Late" (Carole King, Toni Stern) – 4:30  
 "Funky Mozart" (Purdie, Harold Wheeler, Mort Goode) – 3:00  
 "You've Got a Friend" (Carole King) – 3:51

Personnel 
 Bernard Purdie – drums
 Snooky Young, Gerry Thomas – trumpet
 Billy Mitchell, Donald Ashworth, Lou Delgatto, Seldon Powell, Warren Daniels – reeds
 Harold Wheeler – piano, electric piano, arranger, conductor 
 Neal Rosengarden – harpsichord, tambourine  
 Billy Nichols, Cornell Dupree – guitar
 Chuck Rainey – electric bass
 Norman Pride – congas, bongos 
 Carl Hall, Hilda Harris, Norma Jenkins, Tasha Thomas – vocals

Production 
 Bob Thiele – producer
 Gene Paul – engineer

References

Bernard Purdie albums
1971 albums
Mega Records albums
Flying Dutchman Records albums
Albums produced by Bob Thiele